The National Dialogue Party is a secular Lebanese political party founded by businessman, industrialist, philanthropist and engineer Fouad Makhzoumi in 2004. It  has one seat in the Parliament of Lebanon. The party publishes the Al Hiwar newspaper. Its main office is in the Marj el Zouhour Building, Dona Maria Street in Ras el Nabeh, Beirut.

Activities
Makhzoumi states that its central belief is that the "Lebanese people deserve a government that is free, democratic, and responsive to their needs." As such, the party envisions electoral reforms based upon democracy, transparency in government, secularism, and proportional representation. The party believes that the 2006 Israel-Hezbollah conflict raised the stature of Hezbollah in Lebanon while destabilizing the democratic government.

Makhzoumi also established the Lebanon-based "Makhzoumi Foundation" charity organization providing educational services and public awareness in social issues. He also established the US-based "Future Millennium Foundation".

Makhzoumi is presently the Chairman of Future Pipe Group (FPI), a multinational corporation. He also acted as the President of the International Desalination Association (IDA) between 1995 and 1997, and is currently the Controller of the Association. He acted as well as Vice Chairman of the Institute for Social and Economic Policy in the Middle East at the John F. Kennedy School of Government at Harvard University, between 1995 and 1998. He is currently a member of the International Board of the "Council on Foreign Relations – US/Middle East Project", since 1996.

See also
List of political parties in Lebanon

References

External links
Party Platform (In Arabic)
Fouad Makhzoumi Interview during Late Edition with Wolf Blitzer Broadcast 21 September 2003. Archived by Daniel Pipes.

Liberal parties in Lebanon
Political parties established in 2004
Secularism in Lebanon